Lepisorus ussuriensis is a species of plants belonging to the family Polypodiaceae.

It is native to  Southern Russian Far East to China and Korea.

References

Polypodiaceae